, abbreviated as GuP or Garupan , is a Japanese anime franchise created by Actas which depicts a competition between girls' high schools practicing tank warfare as a sport. The series was directed by Tsutomu Mizushima, written by Reiko Yoshida and produced by Kiyoshi Sugiyama. Takaaki Suzuki, who had earlier acted as a military history advisor for Strike Witches and Upotte!!, was involved in the production of the anime. The TV series initially aired in Japan between October and December 2012, with two additional episodes that aired in March 2013 and an original video animation released in July 2014. Nine manga series and a light novel adaptation have been published by Media Factory. An animated film was released in Japanese theaters on November 21, 2015. A six-part theatrical anime series premiered in 2017.

Story

Setting
The story takes place in a world where historical World War II–era tanks are maintained for sport-style warfare competitions and large carrier ships, known as Academy Ships, support mobile sea communities.

Plot
Miho Nishizumi, a girl from a prestigious family of sensha-dō practitioners who became traumatized by a past event, transfers to Ōarai Girls High School to get away from sensha-dō, as she presumed the school was no longer practicing the sport. However, shortly after Miho begins her new school life and makes some new friends, the student council announces the revival of sensha-dō at Ōarai and coerces Miho, the only student with prior experience, to join. While reluctant to join at first, having practically been forced, Miho soon warms up to sensha-dō and they enter a national championship, facing off against various other schools, in a competition that becomes a serious matter after Miho and the others learn that their school will be closed should they not win.

The spin-off manga, Girls und Panzer: Little Army, follows Miho in her elementary school days as she participates in sensha-dō alongside her friends Emi, Hitomi, and Chihiro.

Media

Anime

Girls und Panzer aired its first episode in Japan on Tokyo MX on October 9, 2012, TV Osaka and TV Aichi on October 11, BS11 on October 14, and AT-X on October 17, and concluded on March 25, 2013, with 12 episodes. The anime series was produced by Actas and directed by Tsutomu Mizushima from a series composition written by Reiko Yoshida. Shirō Hamaguchi served as the series composer. Choucho performed the opening theme music for the series titled "Dream Riser", while Mai Fuchigami, Ai Kayano, Mami Ozaki, Ikumi Nakagami, and Yuka Iguchi, voicing the five main characters of the series, sang the ending theme music titled "Enter Enter Mission!" It was collected into six Blu-ray and DVD volumes that were released in Japan from December 21, 2012, to June 21, 2013. Each volume contains the anime series' original video animation (OVA) and an OVA featuring Yukari Akiyama's lecture about tanks that appear in the series titled .

A new OVA depicting the unseen match between Ōarai Girls' Academy and Anzio Girls' High School in the seventh episode, titled , was released simultaneously in 14 theaters and several online distribution services in Japan on July 5, 2014. Its Blu-ray and DVD were released in Japan on July 25, 2014, which include a new episode of Yukari Akiyama's Tank Course featuring Italian tanks that appear in the OVA. The OVA was aired in Japan on AT-X on June 21, 2015, on BS11 on December 30, and on Tokyo MX on January 3, 2016.

An animated film by Mizushima serving as a sequel to the anime series, titled , premiered in Tokyo on November 20, 2015, and was theatrically released in Japan on November 21. The film was released on Blu-ray and DVD in Japan on May 27, 2016, which include a new OVA, titled , that is set after the events of the film and a new episode of Yukari Akiyama's Tank Course. The film is followed by a six-part animated film series by Mizushima titled , with the first film in the series being released in Japan on December 9, 2017. , a total of three films have been released. A compilation film combining the twelve episodes of the series and This Is the Real Anzio Battle! OVA into a two-hour runtime, titled , was released in 110 theaters and several 4DX and MX4D screenings in Japan on September 29, 2018. The film was released on Blu-ray and DVD in Japan on February 23, 2019.

Sentai Filmworks announced the acquisition of Girls und Panzer in September 2012, and released the 12 episodes of the series on Blu-ray and DVD in North America on December 3, 2013, and the six episodes of its OVA on the same formats on February 25, 2014. Crunchyroll streamed the series in the United States, Canada, the United Kingdom, Ireland, Australia, New Zealand, the Netherlands, Scandinavia, and South Africa from October 10, 2012, to March 31, 2022. A scene in the Japanese broadcast of the eighth episode, where the characters Katyusha and Nonna sing the Soviet folk-based song "Katyusha", was removed by Crunchyroll, with Jeff Chuang of Japanator stating that "copyright reason is the most likely why the segment was cut". Sentai Filmworks restored the missing scene in their home media release of the series, but the song was replaced with a different one, later revealed as the instrumental version of "Korobeiniki". In October 2012, Anime Network licensed the series for a November release. MVM Entertainment announced the acquisition of the series in October 2013. They released the series on Blu-ray and DVD in the United Kingdom in April 2014 and its OVA on the same formats in June. Hanabee Entertainment licensed Girls und Panzer for an Australian release in November 2013, and released the series and its OVA on Blu-ray and DVD on March 5, 2014. Hidive began streaming the series after the acquisition of the assets from Anime Network in June 2017.

Manga

A manga adaptation of Girls und Panzer, illustrated by Ryohichi Saitaniya, was serialized by Media Factory in their magazine Monthly Comic Flapper from June 5, 2012, to March 5, 2014. The first volume of the manga was published in Japan on September 21, 2012, and the fourth and final volume on April 23, 2014. Seven Seas Entertainment licensed the manga for English publication in North America in July 2013, with its first volume being released on June 3, 2014, and final volume on June 9, 2015.

Gakken began serializing a 4-panel manga for the series in Megami Magazine on July 30, 2012. Animedia website from February 10, 2015, to July 26, 2022, ended due to "production reasons". , the manga has been published in a single volume in Japan. A gekiga manga for the series, titled , was illustrated by Motofumi Kobayashi and serialized by Shogakukan in their magazine Corocoro Aniki from December 15, 2017, to March 15, 2021. It was published in a single volume in Japan on March 26, 2021.

Spin-offs
A spin-off of the series depicting Miho Nishizumi in her childhood, titled , was illustrated by Tsuchii and serialized by Media Factory in their magazine Monthly Comic Alive from June 27, 2012, to January 26, 2013. The first volume of the manga was published in Japan on October 23, 2012, and the second and final volume on February 23, 2013. Seven Seas Entertainment acquired the English license of the manga in July 2013, and released in North America its first volume on December 16, 2014, and final volume on  March 10, 2015. Its sequel, Girls und Panzer: Little Army II, was serialized in Monthly Comic Alive magazine from April 27, 2015, to March 26, 2016. Three volumes of the manga were published in Japan.

The second spin-off of the series by Maruko Nii, titled , began serialization by Media Factory in Monthly Comic Alive magazine on May 27, 2013. The first volume was published in Japan on October 23, 2015. , a total of 19 volumes have been published.

A spin-off of the series by Takeshi Nogami and Takaaki Suzuki, titled , features a new heroine (Shizuka Tsuruki) and was serialized by Media Factory in Monthly Comic Flapper magazine from September 5, 2014, to March 5, 2021. A total of 16 volumes were published in Japan from February 23, 2015, to April 23, 2021. A spin-off of the series by Saitaniya taking place after the practice match of Ōarai Girls' Academy with St. Gloriana Girls' College, titled , was serialized by Kadokawa on their webcomic service ComicWalker from November 19, 2014, to August 19, 2015. A total of two volumes were published in Japan from March 23 to September 23, 2015.

A comedy spin-off illustrated by Midori Hagi, titled , serves as an explanation for the history, development, and technical details of tanks and other vehicles that appear in the series. Media Factory serialized the manga in Monthly Comic Flapper magazine from August 5, 2016, to June 5, 2019. A total of five volumes were published in Japan from February 23, 2017, to June 22, 2019.

A spin-off of the series featuring Erika Itsumi of Kuromorimine Girls' High School, titled , was illustrated by Saitaniya and serialized by Kadokawa on ComicWalker website from September 19, 2016, to March 19, 2018. A total of three volumes were published in Japan from February 23, 2017, to April 23, 2018. A spin-off of the series featuring Katyusha and Nonna of Pravda Girls' High School, titled , was illustrated by Hajime Yoshida and serialized by Kadokawa on ComicWalker website from July 19, 2018, to December 19, 2021. A total of five volumes were published in Japan from January 23, 2019, to December 22, 2021. A spin-off of the series featuring Noemi Kohiyama of Count High School, titled , began serialization by Kadokawa on ComicWalker website on November 16, 2018. , the manga has been published in two volumes in Japan.

A "gag" spin-off of the series featuring Anzio Girls' High School after the events of Girls und Panzer der Film, titled , was serialized by Kadokawa on the official Twitter account of Dengeki Twitter Magazine from February 1, 2019, to June 21, 2021. A total of three volumes were published in Japan from September 27, 2019, to June 25, 2021. A short comedy manga by Yoshida, titled , began serialization by Monthly Comic Alive magazine's web label Comic Alive+ on the websites ComicWalker and Niconico Seiga on October 7, 2022.

Anthologies
Several anthologies based on the series were released in Japan. The first anthology, had two volumes published by Media Factory from October 23, 2013, to November 22, 2014. Aki★Eda, EXCEL, Shin Kyogoku, Kobayashi, Saitaniya, Kouhei Takanaga, Shinobu Take, Tsuchii, Maruko Nii, Takeshi Nogami, Hagi, Yasuhiro Makino, Miki Matsuda, Eichi Mudoh, and Takuma Morishige each authored a manga in the first volume, while 15 anime cast joined the writing team for the second volume. The second anthology, provides "spotlights" to other schools that appear in the series. The first volume featuring St. Gloriana Girls' College was published by Ichijinsha on November 5, 2014. , it has been published in nine volumes. The third anthology, was published by Media Factory on November 21, 2015. The fourth anthology, had four volumes published by Media Factory from March 23, 2017, to March 23, 2018, with additional release of two complementary volumes featuring animals and foods on February 23, 2019.

Light novel

A light novel adaptation of Girls und Panzer, written by Yuu Hibiki and illustrated by Fumikane Shimada and Shin Kyougoku, was released by Media Factory in Japan from November 22, 2012, to June 25, 2013. It follows the established story of the series in Saori Takebe's point of view. The light novel was published in three volumes.

Games
Nijibox developed a mobile-based social game based on Girls und Panzer, which was released in Japan on Mobage, GREE, and Mixi on December 7, 2012, and on Pixiv on January 10, 2013. The game ended its service on April 2, 2015. Namco Bandai Games announced a video game based on the series for PlayStation Vita, titled , in November 2013. Developed and published by Namco Bandai Games, the game was released in Japan on June 26, 2014.

A mobile simulation game based on the series, titled , was developed by Showgate for Android and iOS, and released by Mobcast Games in Japan on November 11, 2015. An illustration book for the game is set to be released in Japan on June 28, 2022. Another video game based on the series for PlayStation 4, titled , was announced by Bandai Namco Entertainment in July 2017. Developed by Natsume-Atari, the game was released by Bandai Namco Entertainment in Japan on February 22, 2018, and in the Southeast Asia region on February 27. The game was later released on Nintendo Switch under the title Girls und Panzer: Dream Tank Match DX in Japan and Southeast Asia countries on February 21, 2019.

A mobile-based life simulation game jointly developed by KLab Games and Bandai Namco Entertainment for Android and iOS, titled  was released by Bandai Namco Entertainment in Japan on August 3, 2018. The game ended its service on November 27, 2019.

Other media
A collaborative project between the Girls und Panzer animation team and Belarusian computer game developer Wargaming was unveiled in 2013, aiming to promote the online multiplayer video game World of Tanks in Japan. Part of the collaboration involved the promotion of the game in Japan in the form of advertising and local events, as Wargaming focused to penetrate the Japanese market.

The South-East Asian game server for World of Tanks featured a tutorial documentation in the form of manga, titled . Drawn by Midori Hagi, it features Girls und Panzer characters as they learned how to play the game. The manga game tutorial is available in English, Thai, Traditional Chinese, and Japanese; it depicts the five members of Ōarai Girls High's Anglerfish sensha-dō team as they learn how to play World of Tanks, intending to explain the game's basics to new players in an entertaining and interesting manner. The tutorial manga also had a side effect of introducing Girls und Panzer to many World of Tanks players, increasing its popularity amongst the players in the Asian region.

Girls und Panzer-themed mods for the game were announced at the 2013 Tokyo Game Show; these game mods were distributed as free downloads for players in the South-East Asian server, mainly targeting the Japanese-speaking community. Initially, there were six voice packs released, featuring the voices of all five members of the Anglerfish team, as well as a special voice pack for Nonna, the vice captain of Pravda's sensha-dō team; each of the five crew members of the Anglerfish team voices the five different crew positions in World of Tanks: Commander, Gunner, Loader, Radio Operator, and Driver. The voice packs replaces the standard crew voices with the Girls und Panzer character voices, when tank commands such as "Target acquired!" or "Reloading!" sound in the game. The voice packs, however, are only available in Japanese. Afterwards, a garage mod was released, where players could change the regular game garage to the sensha-dō garage square in Ōarai Girls High's Academy Ship. Another mod that was released allowed players to change the skins of a few select tanks in the game to the paint jobs of the tanks in the Girls und Panzer anime. Tanks include the Panzer IV H of Ōarai Girls High, the Churchill VII of St. Gloriana Girls Academy and the Jagdtiger of Kuromorimine Girls High. The last mod that was made available changed the look of destroyed tanks for certain vehicles; instead of a smoking wreck of metal that is shown when a tank is destroyed, the tank is shown in a moderate condition, with a white flag on top, similar to when tanks are knocked out in Girls und Panzer, to indicate that the tank is destroyed.

These mods were later made available together in a mod pack that is free to download on the South-East Asian server of World of Tanks. On 31 January 2016, the World of Tanks South-East Asian server released an updated version of the Girls und Panzer-themed mod pack, in celebration of the release of Girls und Panzer der Film. It features the voices of the Anglerfish sensha-dō team and replaces the standard game garage with the Ōarai Girls High School Tank Garage. It also features a lot of new tank skins, such as the Panzer IV D of Ōarai Girls High, before it was converted into the Ausführung H model, and the T95, M24 Chaffee, and the M26 Pershing of the university's sensha-dō team, in addition to all the previous ones released in earlier mods.

Reception
The initial television airing of the first 10 episodes within 2012 received favourable television ratings and strong viewership. The relatively early airing timeslot of the show allowed the series to gain better exposure to more viewers. Blu-ray sales of the first anime volume in Japan reached third place on the Oricon charts in mid-February 2013, whilst sales of the second anime volume Blu-ray reached second place in late February with 24,733 copies sold within the first week of release. The third Blu-ray volume met with similar success during March, with 23,528 copies sold within the first week, peaking at third place behind Mobile Suit Gundam Unicorn and Magical Girl Lyrical Nanoha the Movie 2nd A's. The first week sales of the 4th Blu-ray volume reached second place at 28,410 units, behind Evangelion: 3.33 You Can (Not) Redo, which had its debut Blu-ray release the same week. The first week sales of both the 5th and 6th Blu-ray volumes placed first in the weekly Oricon chart, having reached 33,450 units and 32,385 units respectively. The first week sales of the Girls und Panzer: This is the Real Anzio Battle! OVA Blu-ray placed third in the weekly Oricon chart, having reached 35,909 units.

Plastic models of tanks based on those within the anime have topped sales charts in Japan.

In celebration of the popularity of the anime series and to promote local tourism, on 24 March 2013 the town of Ōarai in Ibaraki Prefecture held an event themed along the Girls und Panzer anime, as part of its yearly spring festival. The event featured live tank demonstrations and the sale of anime-themed merchandise.

Famitsu gave the video game adaptation Girls und Panzer: Senshadō, Kiwamemasu! a review score of 23/40. PlayStation LifeStyle gave the game 8/10, highly praising the tank battles for their simplicity and the story for its charm. The game sold 31,526 physical retail copies within the first week of release in Japan.

In 2017, scholar Takayoshi Yamamura described the series as a key example of cooperation between the JSDF and anime productions, noting that the production staff gathered important information with the help of the JGSDF, even riding in a tank at the JGSDF Ordnance School. The show was also helped by the JSDF's Ibaraki Provincial Cooperation Office. However, events which exhibited JSDF tanks drew criticism from the Japanese Communist Party but supported by the newspaper, Sankei Shinbun. Additionally, Yamamura noted that Ground Staff Office of the Ground Self-Defense Force public relations department praised attendance at such events as demonstrating the "effect of the popularity of battle tanks."

Footnotes

References

External links

  
   (via the Internet Archive's Wayback Machine)
 
 
 
 
 

2012 anime television series debuts
2012 manga
2014 video games
2015 video games
2018 video games
Actas
Action anime and manga
Android (operating system) games
Anime with original screenplays
Bandai Namco franchises
Comedy anime and manga
Fictional motorsports in anime and manga
IOS games
Japan-exclusive video games
Kadokawa Dwango franchises
Media Factory manga
Military anime and manga
PlayStation 4 games
PlayStation Vita games
PlayStation Vita-only games
Seinen manga
Sentai Filmworks
Seven Seas Entertainment titles
Fiction about tanks
Video games developed in Japan